Mahatma Gandhi was assassinated on 30 January 1948 at age 78 in the compound of Birla House (now Gandhi Smriti), a large mansion in central New Delhi. His assassin was Nathuram Vinayak Godse, a Chitpavan Brahmin from Pune, Maharashtra, a Hindu nationalist, a member of the Rashtriya Swayamsevak Sangh (RSS), a right-wing Hindu paramilitary organization as well as a member of the Hindu Mahasabha. Godse considered Gandhi to have been too accommodating to Pakistan during the Partition of India of the previous year. Godse tried to assassinate Gandhi two times in 1944 but failed. 

Sometime after 5 p.m., according to witnesses, Gandhi had reached the top of the steps leading to the raised lawn behind Birla House where he had been conducting multi-faith prayer meetings every evening.  As Gandhi began to walk toward the dais, Godse stepped out from the crowd flanking Gandhi's path, and fired three bullets into Gandhi's chest and stomach at point-blank range. Gandhi fell to the ground. He was carried back to his room in Birla House from which a representative emerged sometime later to announce his death.

Godse was captured by members of the crowd—the most widely reported of whom was Herbert Reiner Jr, a vice-consul at the American embassy in Delhi—and handed over to the police.  The Gandhi murder trial opened in May 1948 in Delhi's historic Red Fort, with Godse the main defendant, and his collaborator Narayan Apte, and six more, deemed co-defendants. The trial was rushed through, the haste sometimes attributed to the home minister Vallabhbhai Patel's desire "to avoid scrutiny for the failure to prevent the assassination."  Godse and Apte were sentenced to death on 8 November 1949.  Although pleas for commutation were made by Gandhi's two sons, Manilal Gandhi and Ramdas Gandhi, they were turned down by India's prime minister Jawaharlal Nehru, deputy prime minister Vallabhbhai Patel and the Governor-General Chakravarti Rajagopalachari. Godse and Apte were hanged in the Ambala jail on 15 November 1949.

Preparations

In May 1944, Nathuram Vinayak Godse attempted to assassinate Gandhi with a knife. He led a group of 15 to 20 young men who rushed at Gandhi during a prayer meeting at Panchgani. Godse and his group were prevented by the crowds from reaching Gandhi. He was released due to Gandhi's own policy of declining to press criminal charges.

On September 1944, Godse again led another group to block Gandhi's passage from Sevagram to Mumbai. This time Godse was arrested with a dagger and he uttered threats to kill Gandhi. He was released again owing to Gandhi's policy of not pressing criminal charges.

In early September 1947, Gandhi moved to Delhi to help stem the violent rioting there and in the neighboring province of East Punjab.  The rioting had come in the wake of the partition of the British Indian empire, which had accompanied the creation of the new independent dominions of India and Pakistan, and involved large, chaotic transfers of population between them.

Godse and his assassination accomplices were residents of the Deccan region. Godse had previously led a civil disobedience movement against Osman Ali Khan, the Muslim ruler of the princely Deccan region dominion of Hyderabad State in British India. Godse joined a protest march in 1938 in Hyderabad,   He was arrested for political crimes and served a prison sentence. Once he was out of  prison, Godse continued his civil disobedience and worked as a journalist reporting the sufferings of Hindu refugees escaping from Pakistan, and during the various religious riots that erupted in the 1940s.

Plans to assassinate Gandhi were initiated by Godse and his accomplices in January 1948, after India and Pakistan had already started a war over Kashmir, due to Godse's disagreement with Gandhi's philosophy of non-violence towards Muslims. But Gandhi opposed the decision and went on a fast-unto-death on 13January 1948 to pressure the Indian government to release the payment to Pakistan. The Indian government, yielding to Gandhi, reversed its decision. Godse and his colleagues interpreted this sequence of events to be a case of Mahatma Gandhi controlling power and hurting India.

On the day Gandhi went on hunger strike, Godse and his colleagues began planning how to assassinate Gandhi. Nathuram Vinayak Godse and Narayan Apte purchased a Beretta M1934. Along with purchasing the pistol, Godse and his accomplices shadowed Gandhi's movements.

Assassination attempt on 20 January 1948
Gandhi had initially been staying at the Balmiki Temple, near Gole Market in the northern part of New Delhi, and was holding his prayer meetings there. When the temple was requisitioned for sheltering refugees of the partition he moved to Birla House, a large mansion on what was then Albuquerque Road in south-central New Delhi, not far from the diplomatic enclave.  Gandhi was living in two unpretentious rooms in the left wing of Birla House, and conducting prayer meetings on a raised lawn behind the mansion.

The first attempt to assassinate Gandhi at Birla House occurred on 20January 1948. According to Stanley Wolpert, Nathuram Godse and his colleagues followed Gandhi to a park where he was speaking. One of them threw a grenade away from the crowd. The loud explosion scared the crowd, creating a chaotic stampede of people. Gandhi was left alone on the speakers' platform. The original assassination plan was to throw a second grenade, after the crowds had run away, at the isolated Gandhi. But the alleged accomplice Digambar Badge lost his courage, did not throw the second grenade and ran away with the crowd. All of the assassination plotters ran away, except Madanlal Pahwa who was a Punjabi refugee of the Partition of India. He was arrested. Pahwa was released in 1964.

30 January 1948

Manuben Gandhi 
Manu (Mridula) Gandhi, called "Manuben" in Gujarati fashion, was Mahatma Gandhi's great niece (more precisely, a first cousin twice removed). She had come to join Gandhi's entourage during his peace mission to Noakhali in East Bengal, which had been gripped by communal violence. Abha Chatterjee (Abhaben Chatterjee) was a girl adopted by the Gandhis who would later marry Gandhi's nephew, Kanu Gandhi. Both young women were walking with Gandhi when he was assassinated. According to Last Glimpses Of Bapu, a memoir by Manuben Gandhi published in 1962, Mahatma Gandhi (Bapu) started the day in Birla House by listening to a recitation of the Bhagavad Gita. He then worked on a Congress constitution he wanted to publish in the Harijan, had his bath and massage at 8a.m., and reprimanded Manuben to take care of herself since her health was not what it should be for an 18-year-old. He then ate lunch with Pyarelalji discussing Noakhali riots. After lunch, states Manuben, Gandhi napped. After waking up, he had a meeting with Sardar Dada. Two Kathiawar leaders wanted to meet him, and when Manuben informed Gandhi that they wanted to meet him, Gandhi replied, "Tell them that, if I remain alive, they can talk to me after the prayer on my walk".

According to Manuben's memoir, the meeting between Vallabhbhai Patel and Gandhi went past the scheduled time and Gandhi was about ten minutes late to the prayer meeting. He began his walk to the prayer location by walking with Manuben to his right and Abha to his left, holding onto them as walking sticks. A stout young man in khaki dress, wrote Manuben, pushed his way through the crowd bent over and with his hands folded. Manuben thought that the man wanted to touch Gandhi's feet. She pushed the man aside saying, "Bapu is already ten minutes late, why do you embarrass him". Godse pushed her aside so forcibly that she lost her balance and the rosary, notebook, and Gandhi's spittoon she was carrying, fell out of her hands. She recalled that as she bent to the ground to pick up the items she heard four shots, resounding booms, and she saw smoke everywhere. Gandhi's hands were folded, with his lips saying, "Hey Ram...! Hey Ram...!". Abhaben, wrote Manuben, had also fallen down and she saw the assassinated Gandhi in Abhaben's lap.

The pistol shots had deafened her, wrote Manuben, the smoke was very thick, and the incident complete within 3 to 4minutes. A crowd of people rushed towards them, according to Manuben. The watch she was carrying showed 5:17p.m. and blood was everywhere on their white clothes. Manuben estimated that it took about ten minutes to carry Gandhi back into the house, and no doctor was available in the meanwhile. They only had a first aid box, but there was no medicine in it for treating Gandhi's wounds. According to Manuben,  Gandhi had suffered profuse blood loss. Everyone was crying loudly. In the house, Bhai Saheb had phoned the hospital many times, but was unable to reach any help. He then went to Willingdon Hospital in person, but came back disappointed. Manuben and others read the Bhagavad Gita as Gandhi's body lay in the room. Col. Bhargava arrived, and he pronounced Gandhi dead.

Herbert Reiner 

According to several reports, while the attending crowd was still in shock, Gandhi's assassin Godse was seized by Herbert Reiner Jr, a 32-year-old, newly arrived vice-consul at the American embassy in Delhi. According to an obituary for Reiner published in May 2000 by The Los Angeles Times, Reiner's role was reported on the front pages of newspapers around the world,

Although there were some armed guards present, Reiner felt that the security measures were inadequate, especially in view of an attempted bomb explosion at the same location ten days before. By the time Gandhi and his small party reached the garden area a few minutes after five, the crowd had swelled to several hundred, which Reiner described as comprising "schoolboys, girls, sweepers, members of the armed services, businessmen, sadhus, holy men, and even vendors displaying pictures of 'Bapu'". At first, Reiner had been at some distance from the path leading to the dais, but he moved forward, explaining later, "An impulse to see more, and at a closer range, of this Indian leader impelled me to move away from the group in which I had been standing to the edge of the terrace steps".

As Gandhi was walking briskly up the steps leading to the lawn, an unidentified man in the crowd spoke up, somewhat insolently in Reiner's recollection, "Gandhiji, you are late". Gandhi slowed down his pace, turned toward the man, and gave him an annoyed look, passing directly in front of Reiner at that moment.  But no sooner had Gandhi reached the top of the steps, than another man, a stocky Indian man, in his 30s, and dressed in khaki clothes, stepped out from the crowd and into Gandhi's path.  He soon fired several shots up close, at once felling Gandhi.  A BBC correspondent Robert Stimson described what happened next in a radio report filed that night: "For a few seconds no one could believe what had happened; every one seemed dazed and numb. And then a young American who had come for prayers rushed forward and seized the shoulders of the man in the khaki coat. That broke the spell. ... Half a dozen people stooped to lift Gandhi. Others hurled themselves upon the attacker. ... He was overpowered and taken away".  Others, as well, described how the crowd seemed paralyzed until Reiner's action.

Robert Trumbull of The New York Times, who was an eyewitness, described Reiner's action in a front-page story on January31, 1948, Reiner too had noticed a man in khaki step into the path leading to the dais, but his further view was occluded by a party of associates following Gandhi.  He soon heard sounds, though, which in his words were "not loud, not ringing, and not unlike the reports of damp firecrackers ..."  and which for a moment made him wonder if some sort of celebration was underway.

The details and the role of Reiner in seizing Godse vary by the source. According to Frank Allston, Reiner stated that  According to Tunzelmann, Godse was seized and pummeled by Reiner. According to K. L. Gauba, Reiner was the "unsung hero" and had he not acted "Godse would probably have shot his way out". Reiner was standing in the front row, states Pramod Kapoor, and he seized and held Godse until the police arrived, but his name only appeared in some American newspapers. According to Bamzai and Damle, during the assassination trial, the government did not call to the stand American marine Herbert "Tom" Reiner who caught Godse or the nephew of then Congress minister Takthmal Jain of Madhya Bharat ministry (1948), as well as many others.

Other reports 
According to some reports, Godse surrendered voluntarily and asked for the police. Yet other reports state he was rushed by the crowd, beaten, arrested, and taken to jail. According to some eyewitnesses and court proceedings, Nathuram Godse was seized immediately by witnesses and an Indian Air Force officer dispossessed him of the pistol. The crowd beat him to a bloodied state. The police wrested him loose from the angry crowd, took him to jail. A FIR was filed by Nandlal Mehta at the Tughlak Road police station at Delhi.

The 31 January 1948 issue of The Guardian, a British newspaper, described Gandhi as walking from the "Birla House to the lawn where his evening prayer meetings were held". Gandhi was a bit late for the prayer, leaning on the shoulders of two grand-nieces. On his way, he was approached by a man [Godse] dressed in a khaki bush jacket and blue trousers. According to one version, stated The Guardian, Gandhi smiled back and spoke to Godse, then the assailant pulled out a pistol and fired three times, at point-blank range, into Gandhi's chest, stomach and groin. Gandhi died at 5:40pm, about half an hour after he was shot.

According to The Guardian report, which did not mention Herbert Reiner Jr, Godse "fired a fourth shot, apparently in an effort to kill himself, but a Royal Indian Air Force sergeant standing alongside jolted his arm and wrenched the pistol away. The sergeant wanted to shoot the man but was stopped by the police. An infuriated crowd fell upon the man and beat him with sticks, but he was apprehended by the police and taken to a police station." Godse was questioned by reporters, who in English replied that he was not sorry to have killed Gandhi and awaited his day in court to explain his reasons.

Vincent Sheean was another eyewitness and an American reporter who had covered World War II events. He went to India in 1947 and became a disciple of Gandhi. He was with the BBC reporter Bob Stimson in Birla House premises when Gandhi was assassinated. They stood next to each other by the corner of a wall. According to Sheean, Gandhi walked across the grass in their direction, leaning lightly "on two of the girls", and two or three others following them. Gandhi wrapped in a homespun shawl passed them by, states Sheean's eyewitness account, and climbed up four or five steps to the prayer ground. As usual, according to Sheean, "there was a clump of people, some of whom were standing and some of whom had gone on their knees or bent low before him. Bob and I turned to watch-we were perhaps ten feet away from the steps-but the clump of people cut off our view of the Mahatma now: he was so small".

Then, states Sheean, he heard "four, dull, dark explosions". Sheean asked Stimson, "what's that?" Stimson replied, "I don't know". It was a confusing place, people were weeping and many things happening, wrote Sheean. "A doctor was found, the police took charge; the body of the Mahatma was carried away; the crowd melted, perhaps urged to do so by the police; I saw none of this." Stimson filed a BBC report, then he and Sheean walked up and down the flower bed for a while. Sheean reported that he later met a "young American from the Embassy" who had never been to a prayer meeting before. Sheean did not take in anything the young American said about the scene, but a week later learned that "it was this young man who had captured the assassin, held him for the Indian police" and after turning the assassin over, it was this young American who searched the crowd for a doctor. He experienced a tribal pride, states Sheean, that even though he was paralyzed and helpless on the day of Gandhi's assassination, "one of his breed had been useful".

According to Ashis Nandy, before firing the shots Godse "bowed down to Gandhi to show his respect for the services the Mahatma had rendered the country; he made no attempt to run away and himself shouted for the police". According to Pramod Das, Godse after firing the shots raised his hand with the gun, surrendered and called for the police. According to George Fetherling, Godse did not try to flee, he "stood silently waiting to be arrested but was not approached at first because he was still armed; at last a member of the Indian air force grabbed him by the wrist, and Godse released his weapon". Police, states Fetherling, then "quickly surrounded Godse to prevent the crowd from lynching him". According to Matt Doeden and others, "Godse did not flee the scene, and he voluntarily surrendered himself to the police".

Death 
According to some accounts, Gandhi died on the spot. In other accounts, such as one prepared by an eyewitness journalist, Gandhi was carried back into the Birla House, into a bedroom, where he died about 30minutes later as one of Gandhi's family members read verses from Hindu scriptures.

Motives
During the subsequent trial, and in various witness accounts and books written since, the motivation of Godse has been summarized, speculated about and debated. Godse did not deny killing Gandhi, and made a long statement explaining his motivations for the assassination of Gandhi. Some of these motivations were:
 Godse felt that the massacre and suffering caused during, and due to, the partition could have been avoided if Gandhi and the Indian government had acted to stop the killing of the minorities (Hindus and Sikhs) in West and East Pakistan. He stated Gandhi had not protested against these atrocities being suffered by Hindus in Pakistan and had instead resorted to fasts. In his court deposition, Godse said, "I thought to myself and foresaw I shall be totally ruined, and the only thing I could expect from the people would be nothing but hatred ... if I were to kill Gandhiji. But at the same time I felt that the Indian politics in the absence of Gandhiji would surely be proved practical, able to retaliate, and would be powerful with armed forces. No doubt, my own future would be totally ruined, but the nation would be saved from the inroads of Pakistan.'"
 Godse stated that Gandhi's fast to pressure the Indian government to release the final payment to Pakistan that it had previously frozen because of the war in Kashmir, and the Indian government's subsequent policy reversal, was proof that the Indian government reversed its decision to suit the feelings of Gandhi. India, said Godse, was not being run by the force of public opinion, but by Gandhi's whims. Godse added that he admired Gandhi for his lofty character, ceaseless work and asceticism, and Gandhi's formidable character meant that his influence outside of the due process would continue while he was alive. Gandhi had to be removed from the political stage, so that India can begin looking after its own interests as a nation, according to Godse.
 Godse stated he did not oppose Gandhian ahimsa teachings, but Gandhi's talk of religious tolerance and nonviolence had already caused India to cede Pakistan to Muslims, uprooted millions of people from their home, caused immense violent loss of life and broken families. He believed that if Gandhi was not checked he would bring destruction and more massacres to Hindus. In Godse's opinion, "the only answer to violent aggression was violent self-defense". Godse stated that "Gandhi had betrayed his Hindu religion and culture by supporting Muslims at the expense of Hindus" because his lectures of ahimsa (non-violence) were directed at and accepted by the Hindu community only. I decided all of a sudden to take the extreme step against Gandhi". I did not hate Gandhi, I revered him because we both venerated much in Hindu religion, Hindu history and Hindu culture, we both were against superstitious aspects and the wrongs in Hinduism. Therefore, I bowed before Gandhi when I met him, said Godse, then performed my moral duty and killed Gandhi.

Trial and judgments

The assassination was investigated, and many additional people were arrested, charged and tried in a lower court. The case and its appeal attracted considerable media attention, but Godse's statement in his defense to the court was banned immediately by the Indian government. Those convicted were either executed or served their complete sentences.

Investigation and arrests
Along with Nathuram Godse many other accomplices were arrested. They were all identified as prominent members of the Hindu Mahasabha – a nationalist organization.

Along with Godse and accomplices, police arrested the 65-year-old Vinayak Damodar Savarkar, who they accused of being the mastermind behind the plot.

 Arrested 
The accused, their place of residence and occupational background were as follows:
 Nathuram Vinayak Godse (Pune, Maharashtra; a former member of Rashtriya Swayamsevak Sangh, editor, journalist)
 Narayan Apte (Pune, Maharashtra; formerly: British military service, teacher, newspaper manager)
 Vinayak Damodar Savarkar (Mumbai, Maharashtra; author, lawyer, former member of Rashtriya Swayamsevak Sangh, former president of Akhil Bharatiya Hindu Mahasabha)
 Shankar Kistayya (Pune, Maharashtra; rickshaw puller, domestic worker employed by Digambar Badge)
 Dattatraya Parchure (Gwalior, Madhya Pradesh; medical service, care giver)
 Vishnu Karkare (Ahmednagar, Maharashtra; orphan; odd jobs in hotels, musician in a traveling troupe, volunteer in relief efforts to religious riots (Noakhali), later restaurant owner)
 Madanlal Pahwa (Ahmednagar refugee camp, Maharashtra; former British Indian army soldier, unemployed, Punjabi refugee who had migrated to India from Pakistan during the Partition.)
 Gopal Godse (Pune, Maharashtra; brother of Nathuram Godse; storekeeper, merchant)

Digambar Badge was alleged to be one of the conspirators and an active participant in the murder plan. After his arrest, he made a statement admitting his own guilt and incriminating his accomplices. He expressed his willingness to appear before  a magistrate and repeat his statement; so, he was tendered a conditional pardon and thus he became King's evidence. 

 Trial and sentencing: Lower Court 
The trial began on 27May 1948 and ran for eight months before Justice Atma Charan passed his final order on 10February 1949. The prosecution called 149 witnesses, the defense none. The court found all of the defendants except one guilty as charged. Eight men were convicted for the murder conspiracy, and others convicted for violation of the Explosive Substances Act. Savarkar was acquitted and set free. Nathuram Godse and Narayan Apte were sentenced to death by hanging and the remaining six (including Godse's brother, Gopal) were sentenced to life imprisonment.

 Appeal: High Court 

Of those found guilty, all except Godse appealed their conviction and sentence. Godse accepted his death sentence, but appealed the lower court ruling that found him guilty of conspiracy. Godse argued, in his limited appeal to the High Court, that there was no conspiracy, he alone was solely responsible for the assassination, witnesses saw only him kill Gandhi, that all co-accused were innocent and should be released. According to Markovitz, Godse's declarations and expressed motivations during the appeal have been analyzed in contrasting ways. For example, "while Robert Payne, in his detailed account of the trial, dwells on the irrational nature of his statement, Ashis Nandy underlines the deeply rational character of Godse's action, which, in his view, reflected the well-founded fears among upper-caste Hindus of Gandhi's message and its impact on Hindu society."

The appeal by the convicted men was heard from 2 May 1949, at Peterhoff, Shimla (Himachal Pradesh) which then housed the Punjab High Court. The High Court confirmed the findings and sentences of the lower court except in the cases of Dattatraya Parchure and Shankar Kistayya who were acquitted of all charges.

Professor Claude Markovits, a Senior Research Fellow at the French National Centre for Scientific Research, wrote a 2004 book (The UnGandhian Gandhi: The Life and Afterlife of the Mahatma) that the trial and execution was rushed, attributing the haste to Vallabhbhai Patel's efforts "to avoid scrutiny for the failure to prevent the assassination."

 Executions 
Godse and Apte were sentenced to death on 8November 1949. Pleas for commutation were made by Gandhi's two sons, Manilal Gandhi and Ramdas Gandhi, but these pleas were turned down by India's prime minister Jawaharlal Nehru, deputy prime minister Vallabhbhai Patel and the Governor-General Chakravarti Rajagopalachari. Godse and Apte were hanged in Ambala Gaol on 15November 1949. According to the Almanac of World Crime, at the hanging Apte's neck broke and he died instantly, but "Godse died slowly by the rope"; instead of having his neck snap he choked "to death for fifteen minutes".

 Coverage and judge's comments 

The Government of India made the assassination trial public. According to Claude Markovits, Godse ... tried to use the courtroom as a political forum by reading a long declaration in which he tried to justify his crime. He accused Gandhi of complacency towards Muslims, blamed him for the sufferings of Partition and generally criticized his subjectivism and pretension to a monopoly of the truth.  Although his attacks were met with some echo in high-caste Hindu circles traditionally hostile to Gandhi, he could not create a groundswell of opinion in his favour.

Godse later appealed the death sentence verdict in the Appeals Court in Simla, then in Punjab.  He made a plea of poverty and requested that he be allowed to appear and defend himself in person.  As the request was allowed, Godse became the only accused to appear in person at the appeal.  G.D. Khosla, one of the three judges who heard the appeal, later wrote of the Godse statement:

The audience was visibly and audibly moved. There was a deep silence when he ceased speaking.  Many women were in tears and men were coughing and searching for their handkerchiefs.  The silence was accentuated and made deeper by the sound of a[n] occasional subdued sniff or a muffled cough.  It seemed to me that I was taking part in some kind of melodrama or a scene out of a Hollywood feature film. ... the audience most certainly thought Godse's performance was the only worth-while part of the lengthy proceedings ... I have no doubt that had the audience of that day been constituted into a jury and entrusted with the task of deciding Godse's appeal, they would have brought in a verdict of 'not guilty' by an overwhelming majority

Tributes

After the assassination, Prime Minister Jawaharlal Nehru addressed the nation by radio:Muhammad Ali Jinnah, Governor general and founder of Pakistan, on the day of Gandhi's assassination, said:

Gandhi's death was mourned around the world. Field Marshal Jan Smuts, former prime minister of South Africa, and once Gandhi's adversary, said, 

The British prime minister Clement Attlee said in a radio address to the nation on the night of January 30, 1948:

Leo Amery, the British secretary of state during the war said, 

Lord Pethick-Lawrence, the British secretary of state in 1948 said: 

Albert Einstein wrote: The New York Times in its editorial wrote:Over two million people joined the five-mile long funeral procession that took over five hours to reach Raj Ghat from Birla House, where he had been assassinated. Gandhi was cremated in a funeral pyre.
Previous attempt in 1934

A prior, unsuccessful attempt, to assassinate Gandhi occurred on 25June 1934 at Pune. Gandhi was in Pune along with his wife, Kasturba Gandhi, to deliver a speech at Corporation Auditorium. They were travelling in a motorcade of two cars. The car in which the couple was travelling was delayed and the first car reached the auditorium. Just when the first car arrived at the auditorium, a bomb was thrown, which exploded near the car. This caused grievous injury to the Chief Officer of the Pune Municipal Corporation, two policemen and seven others. Nevertheless, no account or records of the investigation nor arrests made can be found. Gandhi's secretary, Pyarelal Nayyar, believed that the attempt failed due to lack of planning and co-ordination.

Aftermath
In the newly formed  Dominion of India, the carnage that had been set off by the Partition of India ended with the shock of Gandhi's assassination.   The RSS,  the Hindu paramilitary volunteer organisation, whose activities had been hidden from public view, and whose member Nathuram Godse had once been, was banned on 4 February 1948.  The ban lasted one year.    A few weeks before,  Vallabhai Patel had invited the RSS and its more overtly political sister organization, the Hindu Mahasabha, to join the Congress and to build the new nation.  He had warned the Hindu nationalists that they were not the only defenders of Hinduism, which was more tolerant than the variety whose ideals they upheld; he had also cautioned his colleagues in the Congress, that members of these Hindu nationalist organizations were not criminals but misguided patriots, who might prove hard to root out.  Nehru argued against this viewpoint, emphasizing that the RSS has a history of easily succumbing to violent solutions, and needed to be punished and dissolved. With Gandhi's assassination, Patel's approach took the back seat.

Gandhi's death indirectly gave Nehru more power. According to historian Percival Spear, "The government was really a duumvirate between him (Nehru), who represented the idealism and left-wing tendencies of the party, and Sardar Vallabhbhai Patel, the realist and party boss from Gujarat who leaned to authoritarianism, orthodoxy, and big business." At Gandhi's urging, Patel had twice abstained from claiming the prime ministership, leading some to think he might affirm his claim now. But Gandhi's assassination had affected Patel as deeply as it did Nehru, and Patel busied himself on the integration of the princely states. Patel died in 1950, and Nehru ruled without any opposition after that.  After the violence of the Partition of India, the Hindu Right and its supporters within the Indian National Congress had asked if as a counterpoint to Pakistan's founding as a state for Muslims, India should not be publicly identified as a state for Hindus. But after Gandhi's assassination, the implication of the Hindu Right in it, and the revulsion felt by many for Hindu extremism as a result, secular values were reestablished in India. 

According to Thomas Hansen,Although Nathuram Godse's inspiration came from Savarkar rather than Gowalkar, the RSS was banned and 20,000 swayamsevaks were arrested during the next few months, while the Hindu Mahasabha remained legal but effectively stigmatized, especially in Maharashtra.  The Chitpavan brahmins (Godse's community) were attacked in a collective retaliation against a community whose Hindu nationalist leanings were well known, and whose claims to past glory and historical dominance in the area were a contentious issue in Maharashtra.

In media
Several books, plays and movies have been produced about the event.
 I, Nathuman Godse speaking is a play composed by Pradeep Dalvi based on the assassination trial. Locally produced as Me Nathuram Godse Boltoy, after seven sold-out shows it was banned in the State of Maharashtra in 1999 on directions from the then BJP-led coalition government in Delhi.
 Gandhi vs. Gandhi is a Marathi play that has been translated into several languages. Its primary plot is the relationship between Gandhi and his estranged son but it also deals briefly with the assassination.
 Nine Hours to Rama is a 1963 British movie based on Stanley Wolpert's novel of the same name, which is a fictional account of the final nine hours leading up to Gandhi's assassination.
 May It Please Your Honor was published in 1977, containing Nathuram Godse's statement to the court, after the Indian Congress party lost power for the first time since Indian independence, and the new government lifted the censorship imposed since 1948 after gaining power in national elections. The text was republished in 1993 as Why I Assassinated Mahatma Gandhi?.
 In the 1982 film Gandhi the actor Harsh Nayyar portrayed Godse at the beginning and the end of the film.
 Hey Ram (2000) is a Tamil-Hindi bilingual film by Kamal Haasan about a fictitious plot to kill Gandhi by a man devastated by the partition riots and his change of heart even as the real-life plot succeeds.
 Gandhi and the Unspeakable: His Final Experiment with Truth'' (2012) by James Douglass is a non-fiction book that seeks to understand not only the facts of the murder but its importance in the larger struggle between non-violence and violence.
 Gandhi Godse: One War (2023) is a fictional movie that reimagines the assassination with the survival of Gandhi

See also
 List of assassinated and executed heads of state and government
 Kapur Commission

References

Footnotes

Citations

Works cited

 
 
 
 
 
 
 
 
 
  (Foreword by: Sarvepalli Radhakrishnan)

Further reading
Assassination-related literature and the variance in its coverage:
 
 Elst, Koenraad (2016). The man who killed Mahatma Gandhi: Understanding the mind of a murderer. Lewiston, New York: Edwin Mellen Press, [2016] (In French: Elst, K., & Frumer, B. (2007). "Pourquoi j'ai tué Gandhi": Examen et critique de la défense de Nathuram Godse. Paris: Les Belles lettres.)
 
 

Funeral, post funeral-rites and memorialization after Gandhi's assassination:

External links

 First Information Report on Gandhi's Murder in Urdu  and translated to English 
 Mahatma Gandhi Assaults & Assassination

Mahatma Gandhi
 
January 1948 events in Asia
1948 murders in India
Deaths by person in India
1940s in Delhi
1948 in India
Gandhi, Mahatma
Murder in Delhi
Deaths by firearm in India

es:Asesinato de Mahatma Gandhi